The following is a list of 2023 box office number-one films in Japan by week. When the number-one film in gross is not the same as the number-one film in admissions, both are listed.

Highest-grossing films
Last updated on 20 March 2023.

See also
List of Japanese films of 2023

References

2023
Japan
2023 in Japanese cinema